Robert Jay Finkelstein (March 26, 1916 – August 27, 2020) was an American theoretical physicist, specializing in elementary particle physics.

Finkelstein was born in Pittsfield, Massachusetts in March 1916. After graduation from Pittsfield High School, he matriculated in 1933 at Dartmouth College, graduating there as salutatorian in the class of 1937. He received his Ph.D. in 1941 from Harvard University with dissertation The Energy Levels of Chrome Alum. II. Magnetic Susceptibility of Cerium Ethylsulfate under the supervision of John Hasbrouck Van Vleck. After completing his last doctoral examination, he went to Washington, DC to join Francis Bitter’s research group in the Navy Department. Finkelstein worked briefly with an operational research group that included Marshall Stone and Joseph Doob but then transferred to a research group working on shockwaves and detonation theory. He found an analytic solution to a shockwave problem that Subrahmanyan Chandrasekhar had previously solved numerically and also co-authored with George Gamow the paper Theory of the Detonation Process.

Finkelstein recounted his experiences as a member of the group working on shockwaves and detonation theory:

As a postdoc Finkelstein was at the University of Chicago and then spent the academic year 1947–1948 at the Institute for Advanced Study as part of a research group (including H. Lewis, S. Wouthuysen, and L. Foldy) under the leadership of Robert Oppenheimer. In 1948 Finkelstein joined the faculty of UCLA as part of the high energy theory group. Several times he was on sabbatical at the Institute for Advanced Study. He was a Guggenheim Fellow for the academic year 1959–1960. He retired from UCLA in 1986 as professor emeritus.

Finkelstein married in 1956. His doctoral students include David Hestenes, Malvin Ruderman, and Jan Smit. He died in Los Angeles, California in August 2020 at the age of 104.

References

External links 

 Oral history interview transcript with Robert Finkelstein on 10 May 2020, American Institute of Physics, Niels Bohr Library & Archives

1916 births
2020 deaths
20th-century American physicists
21st-century American physicists
American centenarians
Dartmouth College alumni
Harvard University alumni
Men centenarians
People from Pittsfield, Massachusetts
Scientists from Massachusetts
University of California, Los Angeles faculty